Madras Medical College (MMC) is a public medical college located in Chennai, Tamil Nadu, India. Established in 1835, it is the second oldest medical college in India, established after Calcutta Medical College.

History
The Government General Hospital was established on 16 November 1664 to treat soldiers of the British East India Company. Madras Medical College was established on 2 February 1835. Mary Scharlieb graduated from Madras Medical College in 1878.

In 1996, when the metropolis of Madras was renamed as Chennai, the college was renamed the Chennai Medical College. It was later re-renamed back to the Madras Medical College since the college was known worldwide by the older name.

The foundation stone for the new building of the college was laid by the then Chief Minister of Tamil Nadu, M. Karunanidhi, on 28 February 2010.

In January 2011, the hospital was renamed as Rajiv Gandhi Government General Hospital.

Red Fort building
A red-brick heritage structure known as the "Red Fort" stands to the east of the MMC buildings. Built in 1897, it has been classified as a Grade I heritage building by the Justice E. Padmanabhan Committee on heritage structures. It housed the anatomy department for several decades, which was partially moved to the new campus of the MMC at the erstwhile Central Prison campus in 2013. In December 2017, the PWD started the restoration of the heritage structure at a cost of  19.7 million. Once restored, the structure will be converted to a museum, with the ground floor showcasing the history of MMC and the first-floor showcasing specimens for comparative anatomy.

New campus
A new campus with a six-storeyed building for Madras Medical College was built on land covering  on the erstwhile central prison premises in 2010 and was completed in 2012. The campus has nearly 1,250 students and 400 faculty and staff members. The campus was built at a cost of  566.3 million and started functioning in 2013. The old MMC buildings presently house the college of pharmacy, school of nursing and also accommodate students of the recently added courses of audiology, speech learning and pathology, radiotherapy and radio diagnosis.

Affiliation
Since 1857, the college has been affiliated to the University of Madras and all degrees of Health Sciences were awarded by the same until 1988 when the Tamil Nadu Dr. M.G.R. Medical University Act, 1987 received the assent of the president of India. This affiliating university started functioning from July 1988 and is governed by the said Act.

The college was declared as an independent university called the Madras Medical College and Research Institute (MMC & RI). Later the status as an independent university was withdrawn shortly afterwards and the college was affiliated back to the Tamil Nadu Dr. M.G.R. Medical University, dropping the suffix: "Research Institute" in 2000.

Institutions attached to Madras Medical College
 Rajiv Gandhi Government General Hospital (RGGGH), Park Town, Chennai – 600003
 Tamil Nadu Government Dental College, Park Town, Chennai - 600003
 Barnard Institute of Radiology, Park Town, Chennai - 600003
 Institute of Mental Health, Kilpauk, Chennai - 600010
 Institute of Obstetrics and Gynaecology and Government Hospital for Women and Children (IOG & GH WC), Egmore, Chennai - 600008
 Institute of Child Health and Government Hospital for Children (ICH & HC), Egmore, Chennai - 600008
 Regional Institute of Ophthalmology and Government Ophthalmic Hospital, Chennai (RIOGOH), Egmore, Chennai - 600008
 Government Institute of Rehabilitation Medicine, K.K. Nagar, Chennai - 600083
 Institute of Thoracic Medicine and Chest Diseases, Chetpet, Chennai - 600031
 Government Peripheral Hospital, Periyar Nagar, Chennai
 Communicable Diseases Hospital (CDH), Tondiarpet, Chennai - 600081

Rankings

The College of Pharmacy was ranked 57 in India by the National Institutional Ranking Framework (NIRF) pharmacy ranking in 2020.

Cultural events
Madras Medical college hosts inter-college cultural extravaganza known as "REVIVALS" and the annual inter-medical sports meet known as "ENCIERRO". Apart from this, it also hosts annual intracollege cultural event known by the name " KALAIOMA".

Administration
The college and hospital are funded and managed by the state government of Tamil Nadu. The head of the institution is the dean followed by the vice-principal.
 Dean of institution: Theranirajan
 Vice-Principal: Kavitha

Notable alumni

 Ayyathan Gopalan, 1888 pass out with honors (LMP). Chief Surgeon, Medical Professor, Social reformer of Kerala (Founder of Sugunavardhini movement, Depressed Classes Mission and leader and Propagandist of Brahmosamaj in Kerala).
 Ayyathan Janaki Ammal(LMP)with honors. First female doctor of Kerala, (Malabar). Sister of Ayyathan Gopalan
 Mukhtar Ahmed Ansari, surgeon and President of the Indian National Congress (1927)
 C.O. Karunakaran, bacteriologist and founder of Government Medical College, Thiruvananthapuram 
 V. Mohan, diabetologist and Padma Shri recipient
 Guruswami Mudaliar, a noted professor at MMC and doctor in Madras
 Arjunan Rajasekaran, urologist and a recipient of the Padma Shri and Dr. B. C. Roy Award
 JS Rajkumar, founder Lifeline group of hospitals, Chennai. Advanced laparoscopic surgeon, former president Association of Surgeons of India (ASI) TN& P chapter
 Kadiyala Ramachandra, professor of medicine and Padma Shri recipient
 Anbumani Ramadoss, former Union health minister
 Natesan Rangabashyam, Gastroenterologist and Padma Bhushan recipient
 Muthulakshmi Reddi, one of the first female doctors in India
 Yellapragada Subbarow, known for the synthesis of the first ever chemotherapeutic drug aminopterin, and subsequently methotrexate. He is also known for the synthesis of folic acid and diethylcarbamazine and the purification of adenosine triphosphate and creatine.
 Tamilisai Soundararajan, Governor of Telangana.
 C. U. Velmurugendran, Neurologist and Padma Shri recipient
 Abraham Verghese, physician, teacher, author and recipient of the U.S. National Humanities Medal
 Raman Viswanathan, chest physician and Padma Bhushan recipient
 Sivapatham Vittal, endocrine surgeon and a recipient of the Padma Shri and Dr. B. C. Roy Award
 P. K. R. Warrier, cardiothoracic surgeon, author and social activist
 Madanur Ahmed Ali, Indian surgical gastroenterologist from Chennai
 V. Maitreyan, Member of Parliament (Rajyasabha)

Notable faculty 
 Subramanian Kalyanaraman, neurosurgeon, Shanti Swarup Bhatnagar laureate
 T. S. Kanaka, Asia's first female neurosurgeon

See also
 List of medical colleges in India
 List of Tamil Nadu Government educational institutions

References

External links

Educational institutions established in 1835
Medical colleges in Tamil Nadu
Universities and colleges in Chennai
1835 establishments in India
Academic institutions formerly affiliated with the University of Madras